Division No. 6, Subd. C is an unorganized subdivision in north-central Newfoundland, Newfoundland and Labrador, Canada. It is in Division No. 6, on the Bay of Exploits.

According to the 2016 Statistics Canada Census:
Population: 681
% Change (2011-2016): 50.7
Dwellings: 829
Area (km2): 4,064.41
Density (persons per km2): 0.2

Newfoundland and Labrador subdivisions